René Corbet (born June 25, 1973) is a Canadian former professional ice hockey player who played in the National Hockey League with the Quebec Nordiques, Colorado Avalanche, Calgary Flames, and the Pittsburgh Penguins.

Playing career
As a youth, Corbet played in the 1986 and 1987 Quebec International Pee-Wee Hockey Tournaments with the Longueuil Chevaliers Selects minor ice hockey team.

Corbet was drafted in the second round (24th overall) in the 1991 NHL Entry Draft by the Quebec Nordiques. A highly touted prospect, Corbet was a prolific scorer in the QMJHL with the Drummondville Voltigeurs, winning the Jean Béliveau Trophy in his final season in 1992–93.

Corbet made his professional debut in 1993–94 and played 9 games with the Nordiques, scoring a goal and an assist. Corbet played primarily for the Nords AHL affiliate, the Cornwall Aces, and won the Dudley "Red" Garrett Memorial Award but managed a further 8 games with Quebec in its final season.

Following the Franchise to Denver, Corbet won the Stanley Cup with the Colorado Avalanche in its inaugural season in 1995-96. Rene established himself the following season with the Presidents' Trophy winning Avalanche in 1996-97 posting 27 points in 76 games. During his fourth season on the Avalanche in 1998–99 Corbet was traded, along with Wade Belak and Robyn Regehr, to the Calgary Flames for Theoren Fleury and Chris Dingman on February 28, 1999. Rene recorded a career-high 31 points to finish the season with the Flames.

Unable to replicate the scoring pace from his junior career, Corbet settled into a checking line role and after only 48 games with the Flames in the 1999–2000 season, Corbet was again traded, along with Tyler Moss to the Pittsburgh Penguins for Brad Werenka on March 14, 2000.

Rene, a free agent, re-signed to one-year deal with the Penguins for the 2000–01 season. Corbet was besieged with injuries, missing half the year but returned to help the Pittsburgh to the Conference finals before moving to Germany in 2001 to join Adler Mannheim of the DEL. Corbet played with Mannheim for the next eight years, leaving the team as the Franchise leader in goals (130) and Captaining the team to the German Championship in 2007 and two cups.

On October 26, 2009, he signed with Norwegian team Frisk Tigers of the GET-ligaen for the 2009–10 season. He signed a one-year extension prior to the 2010-11 season and announced his retirement at the conclusion of the year.

Career statistics

Awards and achievements

References

External links
 

1973 births
Adler Mannheim players
Calgary Flames players
Canadian ice hockey left wingers
Colorado Avalanche players
Cornwall Aces players
Drummondville Voltigeurs players
French Quebecers
Frisk Asker Ishockey players
Ice hockey people from Quebec
Living people
People from Victoriaville
Pittsburgh Penguins players
Quebec Nordiques draft picks
Quebec Nordiques players
Stanley Cup champions
Canadian expatriate ice hockey players in Norway
Canadian expatriate ice hockey players in Germany